() is the name for Norwegian local self-government districts that were legally enacted on 1 January 1838. This system of municipalities was created in a bill approved by the Parliament of Norway and signed into law by King Carl Johan on 14 January 1837. The formannskaps law, which fulfilled an express requirement of the Constitution of Norway, required that every parish form a formannsskapsdistrikt (municipality) on 1 January 1838. In this way, the parishes of the state Church of Norway became worldly, administrative districts as well. (Although some parishes were divided into two or three municipalities.) In total, 396 formannsskapsdistrikts were created under this law, and different types of formannskapsdistrikts were created, also:

History
The introduction of self government in rural districts was a major political change. The Norwegian farm culture (bondekultur) that emerged came to serve as a symbol of nationalistic resistance to the forced union with Sweden. The legislation of 1837 gave both the towns and the rural areas the same institutions: a minor change for the town, but a major advance for the rural communities. The significance of this legislation is hailed by a nationalistic historian, Ernst Sars:
"So great an advance in relation to the political development of the people that on that account it can almost be placed alongside the Constitution. By it the free constitution was given a broad basis to rest upon and be nourished from, and became related to the daily life and activity of the people in such a way that its principles could penetrate everywhere and be most effectively acquired... There  was at that time scarcely any European state where local self-government was so well organized and so widely ramified as it became in Norway through the legislation of 1837."

In 1853, the land registration law superseded the formannsskapsdistrikt by introduction of a new designation, the municipality. Two forms of municipality were created: "rural municipality" and "city" (or "market town"). Each district was to elect a body of selectmen of no less than 12 and no more than 48 members. This body selected a quarter of their members as a committee, which together with the local magistrate, established taxes to be levied and improvements to be performed in the district. The local chairman also represented the municipality at the county level.

Almost one century later in 1936, a local self-government district law was enacted  which created 682 rural municipalities and 65 city municipalities in Norway. Among the city municipalities, 43 had the status of market town (kjøpstad) and 22 were recognized harbors for export/import (ladested). Norway included a subordinate category to the market town, the "small seaport" (lossested or ladested), which was a port or harbor with a monopoly to import and export goods and materials in both the port and for a surrounding outlying district. Typically, these were locations for exporting timber and importing grain and goods. Local farm goods and timber sales were all required to pass through merchants at either a lading place or a market town prior to export. This incentive ensured that local trading went through local merchants, a technique which was so effective in limiting smuggling that customs revenues increased from less than 30% of the total tax revenues in 1600 to more than 50% of the total taxes by 1700.

During the last half of the 20th century, the distinction between the different types of municipalities was decreased, and in 1992, legislation eliminated all distinctions.  Now, all municipalities are simply municipalities.

List of districts
This is a list of the districts that were initially created on 1 January 1838.  The original spellings have been used (many spellings have changed since that time.  For a present list of current municipalities, see the List of municipalities of Norway.

References

 
Political history of Norway
1837 in Norway
1838 introductions